Margaret Bruce Gill (born February 21, 1985) is the co-founder and president of Golden Road Brewing, a subsidiary of AB InBev.

She began her career in beer as a regional sales manager for Oskar Blues Brewery.

Career
Gill regularly reports on food for Vice and appeared on Beerland and Munchies.

Education

Gill grew up in Virginia and graduated with a BA in Classics from Yale in 2007.

Recognition

 Forbes 30 Under 30 list in 2014 at 28 years old, featured food and drink honoree
 Wine Enthusiast's Top 40 Under 40 Tastemakers in 2014
 Golden Road Brewing and Gill honored as California Small Business of the Year for Los Angeles County, 2014; nominated by Assemblyman Gatto
 Golden Road Brewing and Gill honored as 2015 Blue Ribbon Small Business Award Winner by U.S. Chamber of Commerce, nominated for Small Business of the Year

References

External links 
 Golden Road Brewing

1985 births
Living people
American brewers
American women company founders
American company founders